Papyrus 42 (in the Gregory-Aland numbering), designated by 𝔓42, is a small fragment of six verses from the Gospel of Luke dating to the 6th/7th century. 
The Greek text of this manuscript is a representative of the Alexandrian text-type with some Byzantine readings. Aland placed it in Category II.

The manuscript is housed at the Austrian National Library P. Vindob. K. 8706 at Vienna.

See also 
 List of New Testament papyri
 Coptic versions of the Bible

References

External links
 Aland, K and Aland, B. (1995), The Text of the New Testament, trans. Rhodes, EF, Pub. Wm. B. Eerdmans, p. 98, 

New Testament papyri
7th-century biblical manuscripts
Greek-Coptic diglot manuscripts of the New Testament
Biblical manuscripts of the Austrian National Library
Gospel of Luke papyri